Chenggong is a railway station on the Taiwan Railways Administration Taichung line located in Wuri District, Taichung, Taiwan. The name is derived from the nearby Chenggongling military base.

Train tickets from Zhuifen station to Chenggong station via the Chengzhui line are popular among students for having the double meaning of "success in getting a good grade." If pronounced slightly differently, it could also mean "success in getting married."

History
The station was opened on 15 May 1905.

Structure

Service
As a minor station, Chenggong Station is primarily serviced by Local Trains (區間車). A few times per day a Chu-Kuang Express (莒光號) or a Tzu-Chiang Limited Express (自強號) stops at the station.

Nearby stations

See also
 List of railway stations in Taiwan

References

1905 establishments in Taiwan
Railway stations opened in 1905
Railway stations in Taichung
Railway stations served by Taiwan Railways Administration